The University of Religions and Denominations is a teaching and research center focusing on the study of religions and Islamic sects. The president of the university is Seyed Abulhassan Navab, one of its founding members. The university has four vice presidents: Vice President for Academic Affairs, Vice President for Research, Vice President for Cultural & Student Affairs and Vice President for Administrative & Financial Affairs. The university is also a member of the Islamic Seminary.

History
In 1995 a group of scholars from Hawza of Qom interested in and concerned with religious and cultural matters decided to pioneer a movement towards the study of various religions and other Islamic sects and denominations. This resulted in the establishment of a research institute that became the University of Religions and Denominations. This was the first specialized university in the field of religions and denominations in Iran. The institute began its activities with a group of students from Qom Seminary in a small building with minimal resources and facilities. At first, there was a special four-year academic course in three fields: Abrahamic Religions, Non-Abrahamic Religions, and Islamic Sects. During their studies, the students also learned English, Sanskrit, and Hebrew languages. After about ten years the institute met the legal requirements governing the universities in Iran and legally became a university.

The university's objectives
This university is a private centre of learning and research. It has the following ideals and goals: 
 To train students and researchers in the fields of religions, Islamic denominations and Shiite studies 
 To provide Qom Islamic Seminary (Hawza) with support and consultation regarding the above-mentioned fields 
 To train scholars from the seminary for dialogue with scholars of other religions and sects 
 To acquire profound and accurate knowledge of Islam and Shiism
 To answer all questions and inquiries concerning Islam and Shiism 
 To strive for the spread of ethics and spirituality, taking account of what all religions have in common and share with each other
 To strengthen and increase the scientific output of home (Islamic/Iranian) scholars 
 To carry out essential, applicable, and comparative research in the above mentioned fields
 To print and publish magazines, periodicals and books on different religions and sects 
 To establish two-way relationships with similar institutes and universities worldwide as well as other researchers and academics.

Faculties 

The university currently has twelve faculties with various departments under them: 
 Faculty of History
 Department of History of Iran
 Faculty of Islamic Denominations 
 Department of Comparative Jurisprudention and Law
 Department of Islamic Denominations
 Faculty of Law
 Department of Law
 Faculty of Media and Communications
 Department of Media Management
 Faculty of Mysticism
 Department of Religions and Mysticism
 Department of Islamic Mysticism
 Faculty of Nations, Cultures, and Languages
 Department of Arabic Language
 Faculty of Philosophy
 Department of Contemporary Philosophy 
 Department of Islamic Philosophy and Kalām
Faculty of Quranic Studies 
Department of Quranic Studies
 Faculty of Religion and Art
 Department of Art
 Faculty of Religions 
 Department of Abrahamic Religions
 Department of Non-Abrahamic Religions 
 Department of Iranian Religions 
 Department of the Study of Religion
Faculty of Shi'i Studies 
Department of Shi'i kalam
Department of Shi'i Denominations 
Faculty of Woman and Family
Department of Studies of Women

Courses of Study 
Each department has various courses of study.

Religious Studies Work-group 
This group is engaged in researching the Philosophy, Psychology, and Sociology of Religion. It also holds scientific and research seminars on various associated subjects.

The Centre for Religious Studies 
This university has a dedicated research centre which has five research groups and corresponding work-groups. All the research undertaken by the members is carried out under the supervision of this centre. These groups include: 
 Abrahamic Religions: this group carries out research on history and theories, philosophy and theology, ethics and spirituality, sacred scriptures and the laws and rituals of Christian and Jewish religions. 
 Non-Abrahamic Religions: this group is concerned with the study of Eastern, The Far East and Persian Religions. 
 Sufism and Islamic Spirituality: This group works on the history of Sufism, theoretical spirituality, Sufi sects and the comparative study of the mysticism of different religions. Islamic Sects: This group carries out research on Shia, Sunni and Jurisprudential Sects

Publications 
The University’s Publishing House, under the supervision of the president, is responsible for printing and publishing titles containing the outputs of scholars and researchers. There are two separate entities:
 University of Religions Publications: Publishes books written or translated by researchers at the university and its various departments as well as works by other researchers in the field of religions and sects
 Adyan Publications: Publishes books mainly written or translated by scholars from other universities 
The Haft Aseman (Seven Heavens) Quarterly, is the publication of this scholarly/research quarterly. This magazine concerns itself with important and valuable results as learning about the discoveries, doctrines and experiences of the followers of other religions as well as appreciating, restudying, and renewing one’s own religious beliefs. By printing and publishing the results of different research efforts, it paves the way for productive interaction and dialogue between different religions and sects. More than 60 issues of this magazine have been published. It is generally considered one of the essential Persian sources for research on religions and sects. Each issue contains dialogues between scholars from Iran and around the world on the subject of religions and sects. In the section on the glossary of religious terms, an explanation of entries pertaining to other religions is provided.

The Office of International Relations and Cooperation
The Office of International Relations and Cooperation of the university was active in establishing dialogues between followers of various religions and denominations as well as development of relations with universities abroad, including sixteen short-term international courses in English, Spanish, and Arabic, in which professors and graduate students from universities in Europe, the US, Africa, and Asia participated; hosting more than five hundred foreign delegates (individuals or groups) from sixty countries around the globe; invitation of fifty-three ambassadors and embassy officials to visit the university; invitation of more than thirty non-Iranian professors to teach in the university; providing sabbaticals for thirteen faculty members from eleven countries; organizing thirty-eight academic-cultural tours of fifteen countries for the university’s professors and students; sending more than twenty Iranian professors to countries in Europe, America, and the Arab world to teach and meet academic figures; signing more than 150 memoranda of understanding with academic institutes and universities in Iran and abroad; implementing collaborative academic projects with more than fifty international universities, such as the University of Paderborn, Goethe University Frankfurt, University of Potsdam, and the Free University of Berlin (all in Germany), the University of West Bohemia in Czech Republic, the University of Vienna and the University of Graz in Austria, Wasit University, the University of Kufa, and University of Warith Al-Anbiyaa in Iraq, Luke 10 Institute in the US; and the University of the Punjab and Aligarh Muslim University in India.

Library
The university contains a specialized library of religions and denominations. The library contains a large supply of books and periodicals in Persian, Arabic and English. Resources are mainly on Islamic denominations, Christianity, eastern religions and interdisciplinary studies.

The library of this university houses books on Islamic sects, Christianity, Judaism, Hinduism, Buddhism, primitive religions, etc. There are also Islamic, Christian, Jewish and Zoroastrian Encyclopaediae. This library specializes in the field of religions and sects and acts as a reference resource for many clerics and academic researchers. The library has around 56,000 titles in Persian and Arabic languages and about 16,000 Latin and English ones. Moreover, there are many magazines and periodicals in the said languages which can be accessed directly by all students.

The Office of Religions and Human Rights Studies
This office was established in order to deepen and broaden the fundamental and academic efforts in the field of religions and Islamic sects, to examine the meeting points of universally accepted moral values of human rights and religions, to discover the positions of different religions and to promote the religious approach to Human Rights. It began its work in May 2008. Researchers in the field of religions and human rights as well as a group of experts in similar fields hold regular seminars. This office is also responsible for translating and writing books and articles.

The Women and Family Research Institute
University of Religions and Denominations is a research-oriented university. The existence of society's need for scientific knowledge of women and family at the fundamental and practical level, as well as the need of the whole country to make families efficient in Islamic society, results in the establishment of the Women and Family Research Institute.

Necessities
The absence of a correct, comprehensive, and efficient Islamic practice model that fits the conditions of the time and place and the current world society;
Severe and widespread cultural attacks, especially in the field of women and family issues; raised many jurisprudential, legal, political, social, etc. doubts in this field;
The penetration and expansion of the failed atheistic thinking of the West such as feminism in Iran and the influence of many women in the society, especially the responsible and working women;
The existence of severe cultural weakness in the group of believing women and their inability to engage in cultural productions due to their being held back from these matters;
Entering the field of education, information, advertising, etc.

Major goals
Estimating the international, national, and local research needs of society about the future;
Creating a context and a successful relationship with those in charge of managing research affairs in order to carry out the required research of the country and the region
Application of research and research findings in accordance with the goals and strategies of the university

Minor goals
Creating a suitable platform for conducting applied research to respond to the current and future needs of society
Improving the quality of research projects
Research synergy of the Faculty of Women and Family by creating fields of the interdisciplinary and interfaculty research

Services of Research Institute of Women and Family Studies
Quick and easy access of researchers to research resources in the form of creating a complete reference of information sources in the field of women and family, including a specialized library of articles, dissertations, and bibliography;
Providing expert advice and appropriate research services to researchers and researchers;
Determining the policies and strategies that will make the formulation of the document and the national practical plan of family consolidation a reality;
Conducting educational-scientific courses and holding meetings and brainstorming sessions;
Interaction with the scientific community and experts and internal and external decision-making and policy-making institutions.

The Open Education Center
The Open Education Center of the University of Religions and Denominations has been established in 2016 with the aim of short-term education in Iran and the world in the form of workshops, skills, lectures, and scientific trips in person and virtual. In addition to educational activities at the national and international level in various subjects of human sciences and within the framework of the higher goals of the University of Religions and Religions, this center organizes educational courses and scientific trips with the presence of professors and students from 5 continents in different cities of Iran and the world within the framework of the memorandum of understanding. It has organized collaborations between this university and leading universities in European, Asian, and Arab countries.

External links 
 Official Website of University of Religions and Denominations

References 

Rel
Religious education in Iran
Qom